Georg Glaw (16 May 1913 – 14 June 1940) was a German athlete who specialized in the 400 metres hurdles.

In 1934, Glaw became regional champion in both hurdle distances. At the 1938 European Athletics Championships in Paris, he finished fourth. After a third place in 1937 over 110 metres hurdles, he managed to finish as German champion in 400 metres at the 1938 national championships. Glaw started for VfL 96 Halle.

Glaw served as a gefreiter in the German Army during the Second World War. He was killed in action in France on 14 June 1940 and is buried in Niederbronn-les-Bains.

References

1913 births
1940 deaths
Sportspeople from Halle (Saale)
German male hurdlers
German Army soldiers of World War II
German military personnel killed in World War II
Burials in Grand Est